Irish hip hop is the response to the hip hop cultural movement that originated in New York City in the 1970s which, at that time, was most popular in the borough of The Bronx. In the 1980s, breakdancing was the first elements of hip hop culture to preface the Irish hip hop movement, which had started to emerge in Ireland.

References

 
1990s in music
2000s in music
2010s in music
2020s in music